Hyparpax is a genus of moths of the family Notodontidae described by Jacob Hübner in 1825.

Species
Hyparpax aurora  (Smith, 1797) 
Hyparpax venus Neumoegen, 1892
Hyparpax minor  (Barnes & Benjamin, 1924) 
Hyparpax aurostriata Graef, 1888
Hyparpax perophoroides  (Strecker, 1876)

External links

Notodontidae